James Nelson Grundy (born 8 December 1978) is a British Conservative Party politician who has served as Member of Parliament (MP) for Leigh since 2019.

Early life
Grundy was born in Warrington, and raised on the family farm in Lowton, where he still resides. Grundy was also educated locally, having attended both Lowton St Mary's Primary School and Lowton High School.

Political career 
Grundy was elected to represent the Lowton East ward on Wigan Metropolitan Borough Council as a councillor in the 2008 local elections. He was elected to Parliament at the 2019 general election, taking the seat from Labour's Jo Platt. This made Grundy the first ever Conservative MP to represent the Leigh constituency since its creation.

Grundy's general election campaign pledges included respecting Leigh's vote to leave the EU in 2016; fighting for vital local transport infrastructure, such as the completion of the Atherleigh Way Bypass, and the re-opening of Golborne and Kenyon Junction stations; and securing investment for Leigh's town centres.

In 2020, Grundy put forward two bids to the Government's Restoring Your Railway Ideas Fund, progressing his pledge to get Kenyon Junction and Golborne Station reopened, following their closure after the Beeching Report. The outcome of these bids was due to be announced in autumn 2020.

During the COVID-19 pandemic, Grundy was actively involved in supporting local people and local businesses. He supported local market traders' calls to open food stalls at Leigh Market as soon as the Government lifted restrictions.

In February 2020, a video recording obtained by LBC showed Grundy publicly exposing his genitals in front of a woman at an event in the Rams Head Inn, Lowton, in 2007. Since the event, Grundy has apologised for the incident and the distress he caused.

In the summer of 2020, Grundy launched his "Shop Safe, Shop Local" campaign, which encouraged local people to return to their local high street following the Coronavirus pandemic. The petition gained hundreds of signatures, and encouraged Wigan Council to deliver two hours' free parking on weekdays in Leigh's town centres, increased hand sanitization stations on the high street, and free face coverings for shoppers provided to local independent businesses.

As MP for Leigh, Grundy writes regular columns for both the Wigan Observer and Leigh Journal, to update constituents of local issues.

References

External links

Living people
Conservative Party (UK) MPs for English constituencies
Members of the Parliament of the United Kingdom for Leigh
UK MPs 2019–present
People from Leigh, Greater Manchester
1978 births